Edward Jesse (January 14, 1780 – March 28, 1868), English writer on natural history, was born at Hutton Cranswick, Yorkshire, where his father was vicar of the parish. 

He became clerk in a government office in 1798, and for a time was secretary to Lord Dartmouth, when president of the Board of Control. In 1812 he was appointed commissioner of hackney coaches, and later he became deputy surveyor-general of the royal parks and palaces. On the abolition of this office he retired on a pension, and he died at Brighton.

The result of his interest in the habits and characteristics of animals was a series of pleasant and popular books on natural history, the principal of which are as follows:
Gleanings in Natural History (1832–1835)
An Angler's Rambles (1836)
Anecdotes of Dogs (1846)
Lectures on Natural History (1863)
He also edited Izaak Walton's The Compleat Angler, Gilbert White's Selborne, and Leitch Ritchie's Windsor Castle, and wrote a number of handbooks to places of interest, including Windsor and Hampton Court.

He married Matilda, daughter of Sir John Morris, 1st Baronet. Their son, John Heneage Jesse, was a noted historian; one of their two daughters was the author and activist Matilda Charlotte Houstoun.

References

Attribution

External links
 
 
 

1780 births
1868 deaths
English non-fiction writers
English male non-fiction writers